Galway Mills Kinnell (February 1, 1927 – October 28, 2014) was an American poet. He won the Pulitzer Prize for Poetry for his 1982 collection, Selected Poems and split the National Book Award for Poetry with Charles Wright. From 1989 to 1993, he was poet laureate for the state of Vermont.

An admitted follower of Walt Whitman, Kinnell rejects the idea of seeking fulfillment by escaping into the imaginary world. His best-loved and most anthologized poems are "St. Francis and the Sow", "After Making Love We Hear Footsteps", and "Wait".

Biography
Born in Providence, Rhode Island, Kinnell said that as a youth he was turned on to poetry by Edgar Allan Poe and Emily Dickinson, drawn to both the musical appeal of their poetry and the idea that they led solitary lives. The allure of the language spoke to what he describes as the homogeneous feel of his hometown, Pawtucket, Rhode Island. He has also described himself as an introvert during his childhood.

Kinnell studied at Princeton University, graduating in 1948 alongside friend and fellow poet W.S. Merwin. He received his master of arts degree from the University of Rochester. He traveled extensively in Europe and the Middle East, and went to Paris on a Fulbright Fellowship. During the 1960s, the Civil Rights Movement in the United States caught his attention. Upon returning to the US, he joined CORE (Congress of Racial Equality) and worked on voter registration and workplace integration in Hammond, Louisiana. This effort got him arrested. In 1968, he signed the "Writers and Editors War Tax Protest" pledge, vowing to refuse tax payments in protest against the Vietnam War. Kinnell draws upon both his involvement with the civil rights movement and his experiences protesting against the Vietnam War in his book-long poem The Book of Nightmares.

Kinnell has been published in Beloit Poetry Journal. From 1989 to 1993 he was poet laureate for the state of Vermont.

Kinnell was the Erich Maria Remarque Professor of Creative Writing at New York University and a Chancellor of the American Academy of Poets. As of 2011 he was retired and resided at his home in Vermont until his death in October 2014 from leukemia.

Work
While much of Kinnell's work seems to deal with social issues, it is by no means confined to one subject. Some critics have pointed to the spiritual dimensions of his poetry, as well as the nature imagery present throughout his work. "The Fundamental Project of Technology" deals with all three of those elements, creating an eerie, chant-like and surreal exploration of the horrors atomic weapons inflict on humanity and nature. Sometimes Kinnell utilizes simple and brutal images ("Lieutenant! / This corpse will not stop burning!" from "The Dead Shall be Raised Incorruptible") to address his anger at the destructiveness of humanity, informed by Kinnell's activism and love of nature. There's also a certain sadness in all of the horror—"Nobody would write poetry if the world seemed perfect." There's also optimism and beauty in his quiet, ponderous language, especially in the large role animals and children have in his later work ("Other animals are angels. Human babies are angels"), evident in poems such as "Daybreak" and "After Making Love We Hear Footsteps."

In addition to his works of poetry and his translations, Kinnell published one novel (Black Light, 1966) and one children's book (How the Alligator Missed Breakfast, 1982).

Kinnell wrote two elegies for his close friend, the poet James Wright, upon the latter's death in 1980. They appear in From the Other World: Poems in Memory of James Wright.

Kinnell’s poem The Correspondence-School Instructor Says Goodbye to His Poetry Students was excerpted in Delia Owens’ novel Where the Crawdads Sing, as a goodbye note left by the protagonist’s mother who left her at a young age.

Personal 
Kinnell married Inés Delgado de Torres, a Spanish translator, in 1965 — naming their two children, Fergus and Maud, after figures in Yeats. They divorced after 20 years of marriage. He married Barbara Kammer Bristol in 1997. He had two grandchildren.

Death 
Kinnell died October 28, 2014 at his home in Sheffield, Vermont at the age of 87. The cause was leukemia according to his wife, Barbara K. Bristol.

Bibliography

Poetry

Collections
 
 
 
 
 
 "Saint Francis and the Sow" No Mountains Poetry Project Broadside Series (1976)
 Walking Down the Stairs (a collection of interviews) (1978).
 

 
  —winner of the National Book Award and Pulitzer Prize
 

 
 
 
 
  —finalist for the National Book Award
 
 
 

Translated collections

Poems

Novels

References

Further reading
Conesa-Sevilla, J. (2008). Dreaming With Bear (Kinnell's Poem). Ecopsychology Symposium at the 25th Annual Conference of the International Association for the Study of Dreams, Montreal, July 11.

External links

Poems by Kinnell and biography at PoetryFoundation.org
"Interview with Galway Kinnell by Mike Edgerly on Minnesota Public Radio" MPR Interview
"The loveliness of pigs: Galway Kinnell searches for the real beauty" interview and poem "Daybreak" on the Christian Science Monitor
Cortland Review  interview and poem "The Fundamental Project of Technology"
"Galway Kinnell reads 'Wait' " for the WGBH series, New Television Workshop
" 'Since you asked..,' with Galway Kinnell for the WGBH series, *New Television Workshop
Profile and poems at Academy of American Poets
 1988 Whiting Writers' Award Keynote Speech
Modern American Poetry short biography

1927 births
2014 deaths
American tax resisters
French–English translators
German–English translators
Iowa Writers' Workshop faculty
MacArthur Fellows
Members of the American Academy of Arts and Letters
National Book Award winners
The New Yorker people
Poets from Rhode Island
Poets from Vermont
Poets Laureate of Vermont
Pulitzer Prize for Poetry winners
Sarah Lawrence College faculty
Wilbraham & Monson Academy alumni
20th-century American poets
21st-century American poets
American male poets
20th-century translators
20th-century American male writers
21st-century American male writers
Fulbright alumni